001, O01, or OO1 may refer to:

1 (number), a number, a numeral
001, fictional British agent, see 00 Agent
001, former emergency telephone number for the Norwegian fire brigade (until 1986)
AM-RB 001, the code-name for the Aston Martin Valkyrie sports car
1992 OO1, the asteroid 10111 Fresnel
1997 OO1, the asteroid 9987 Peano
O01, an allele, see ABO
O01 Heussler Hamburg Heliport, see list of airports in New York
001, or +1 is the telephone calling code of North America; which includes Canada, the United States and the Caribbean.
001, also known as the Princess of Klaxosaurs, is a character and the central antagonist from DARLING in the FRANXX. 
Player 001, a character from the South Korean survival drama Squid Game.
Zeekr 001, an electric vehicle produced by Geely